The 1950 State of the Union Address was given by Harry S. Truman, the 33rd president of the United States, on Wednesday, January 4, 1950.  He spoke to the 81st United States Congress, to the United States House of Representatives and the United States Senate.  It was a joint session, and the 160th address given.  He said, "Our aim for a peaceful, democratic world of free peoples will be achieved in the long run, not by force of arms, but by an appeal to the minds and hearts of men."  He also said, Our Social Security System should be developed into the main reliance of our people for basic protection against the economic hazards of old-age, unemployment, and illness.

See also
United States House of Representatives elections, 1950

References

External links 
 1950 State of the Union Address (full video at www.buyoutfootage.com)

Presidency of Harry S. Truman
State of the Union addresses
81st United States Congress
State of the Union Address
State of the Union Address
State of the Union Address
State of the Union Address
January 1950 events in the United States